Luis René Barboza Quiróz (born 2 April 1993) is a Bolivian footballer who plays for Aurora of the Primera División in Bolivia.

Career
Born in Santa Cruz, Barboza began playing football as a defender with the youth teams of Blooming. He joined Blooming's senior side in January 2012.

References

1993 births
Living people
Sportspeople from Santa Cruz de la Sierra
Association football defenders
Bolivian footballers
Club Blooming players
2021 Copa América players